These are the official results of the Men's javelin throw event at the 2002 European Championships in Munich, Germany. There were a total number of 21 participating athletes. The final was held on Friday August 9, 2002, and the qualifying round on Wednesday August 7, 2002 with the mark set at 82.00 metres.

Medalists

Schedule
All times are Central European Time (UTC+1)

Abbreviations
All results shown are in metres

Records

Qualification

Group A

Group B

Final

See also
 1999 Men's World Championships Javelin Throw (Seville)
 2000 Men's Olympic Javelin Throw (Sydney)
 2001 Men's World Championships Javelin Throw (Edmonton)
 2003 Men's World Championships Javelin Throw (Paris)
 2004 Men's Olympic Javelin Throw (Athens)
 2005 Men's World Championships Javelin Throw (Helsinki)

References

 Results
 todor66

Javelin throw
Javelin throw at the European Athletics Championships